Lupoglav is a village and municipality in Istria, Croatia. The village population is 288, with a total of 924 in the municipality (2011).

The Lupoglav Municipality is situated on the northeast of the Istrian Region. To the east it borders with the Primorsko-Goranska County and with the Istrian municipalities of Lanišće and Cerovlje and the City of Buzet. The municipality is crossed by the arterial roads that connect the Istrian region with the rest of Croatia – the Istrian Y and the tunnel of Učka. The municipality has a surface area of 92.19 km2, i.e. it accounts for 3.27% of the territory of the Istrian Region.

The Castle Mahrenfels which belonged to the family Herberstein and later to the counts Brigido is situated over the village.

The settlements in the municipality are as follows:
 Boljun, population 82
 Boljunsko Polje, population 162
 Brest pod Učkom, population 55
 Dolenja Vas, population 70
 Lesišćina, population 75
 Lupoglav, population 288
 Semić, population 94
 Vranja, population 98

References

External links

 

Municipalities of Croatia
Populated places in Istria County